Choosing Death: The Improbable History of Death Metal & Grindcore is a book by Albert Mudrian, the founding editor-in-chief of Decibel, a monthly magazine devoted to heavy metal music. The book was first published in 2004 by Feral House and details the evolution of the death metal and grindcore musical genres, from its beginnings as a small subculture exchanging compact cassettes to a genre where some artists reach million-dollar sales. A limited updated and expanded edition was published in hardcover in 2015 by Decibel Books. A further expanded and revised "death-luxe" edition was published in 2016 by Bazillion Points.

The 2016 edition includes forewords by BBC Radio 1 DJ John Peel and Repulsion founder Scott Carlson. A reviewer for Terrorizer praised Choosing Death as "the most informed and comprehensive document on death metal and grind that you will ever see".

The first Choosing Death Fest was held in Philadelphia, Pennsylvania, on April 16, 2016. The first part of the two-part festival was the Choosing Death Fest Grimposium, which included panel discussions with a variety of death metal experts and enthusiasts, and featured an advance screening of the 2016 documentary Death by Metal. The second part, a concert at Union Transfer, was headlined by Nails, and featured Misery Index, Deceased, Noisem, Horrendous, Derketa, and Taphos Nomos.

References

External links 
 Official site

Heavy metal publications
Music books
Death metal
Grindcore
Feral House books
2004 non-fiction books
Bazillion Points books